Abdul Ati al-Obeidi (born 10 October 1939) is a Libyan politician and diplomat. He held various top posts in Libya under Muammar Gaddafi; he was Prime Minister from 1977 to 1979 and General Secretary of General People's Congress from 1979 to 1981. He was one of three main negotiators in Libya's decision to denounce and drop their nuclear weapons program.

In 2011, amidst the First Libyan Civil War between Gaddafi loyalists and Anti-Gaddafi rebels, he was appointed Foreign Minister after the defection of Moussa Koussa. In fact, he had accompanied Koussa to Djerba, Tunisia before returning to Libya while Koussa defected to London. On 3 April 2011 (a week after Koussa's defection), Obeidi flew to Greece to present a peace proposal to his counterpart Dimitrios Droutsas.

On 31 August 2011, he was detained west of Tripoli by rebel forces. In June 2013, a court found him not guilty of a charge of mismanagement.

Career 
General Secretary of the General People's Committee (Prime Minister)
 1 March 1977 to 1 March 1979

General Secretary of the General People's Congress (Head of State)
 2 March 1979 to 7 January 1981

Other positions
 Minister for European Affairs
 Minister of Foreign Affairs: 1982 to 1984; 2011
 Deputy Foreign Minister
 Libyan Ambassador to Tunisia
 Libyan Ambassador to Italy

See also
 History of Libya under Muammar Gaddafi
 Foreign relations of Libya under Muammar Gaddafi

References 

Notes
World Statesmen – Libya

External links 
Britain, Libya to resume diplomatic relations
The meeting that brought Libya in from the cold

1939 births
Living people
Prime Ministers of Libya
Heads of state of Libya
Secretaries-General of the General People's Congress
Foreign ministers of Libya
People of the First Libyan Civil War
Ambassadors of Libya to Tunisia
Ambassadors of Libya to Italy